Ibán Espadas Zubizarreta (born 4 August 1978) is a Spanish retired footballer who played as a forward.

Both major levels of Spanish football combined, he appeared in 104 games and scored 14 goals over nine seasons. In La Liga, he represented Zaragoza.

Club career
Espadas was born in Tolosa, Gipuzkoa. During his career, spent mainly in the second and third divisions, he also made seven La Liga appearances with Real Zaragoza, all in the 2003–04 season – he had previously contributed 18 and four goals to the Aragonese club's previous top-flight promotion.

An unsuccessful Athletic Bilbao youth graduate, Espadas also represented FC Cartagena, Recreativo de Huelva, Cultural y Deportiva Leonesa, Zaragoza B, Cádiz CF, UD Almería, Ciudad de Murcia, Orihuela CF (two spells), Pontevedra CF and Arroyo CP. He retired in June 2014, at the age of nearly 36.

References

External links

1978 births
Living people
People from Tolosa, Spain
Spanish footballers
Footballers from the Basque Country (autonomous community)
Association football forwards
La Liga players
Segunda División players
Segunda División B players
Bilbao Athletic footballers
Athletic Bilbao footballers
FC Cartagena footballers
Recreativo de Huelva players
Cultural Leonesa footballers
Real Zaragoza B players
Real Zaragoza players
Cádiz CF players
UD Almería players
Ciudad de Murcia footballers
Orihuela CF players
Pontevedra CF footballers
Spain youth international footballers